Sternotherus odoratus is a species of small turtle in the family Kinosternidae. The species is native to southeastern Canada and much of the Eastern United States. It is also known commonly as the common musk turtle, eastern musk turtle, or stinkpot turtle due to its ability to release a foul musky odor from scent glands on the edge of its shell, possibly to deter predation. This turtle is grouped in the same family as mud turtles.

Etymology 
The generic name Sternotherus is derived from the Greek word sternon, meaning chest or breast, and theros, meaning animal, in reference to the hinge on the turtles plastron. The trivial name, or specific epithet odoratus is Latin, meaning to have an odor,  referencing the scent of the musk from the scent glands that the turtles can produce when under stress or attack.

Taxonomy
The species now known as Sternotherus odoratus was first described by the French taxonomist Pierre André Latreille in 1801, from a specimen collected near Charleston, South Carolina. At the time, almost all turtles were classified in the genus Testudo, and he gave it the name Testudo odorata. In 1825, John Edward Gray created the genus Sternotherus to include species of musk turtles, and it became Sternotherus odoratus. The species has been redescribed numerous times by many authors, leading to a large number of synonyms and some confusion in its classification.

As recently as the 1990s the genus Sternotherus was placed in the synonymy of the closely related genus Kinosternon, however that arrangement was not widely accepted and Sternotherus is generally regarded as a valid genus. The two genera Sternotherus (musk turtles) and Kinosternon (mud turtles), constitute the subfamily Kinosterninae within the family Kinosternidae.

Description

The stinkpot is a small black, grey or brown turtle with a highly domed shell. It has a long neck and rather short legs. The yellow lines on the neck are a good field marker, and often can be seen from above in swimming turtles. Males can usually be distinguished from females by their significantly longer tails and by the spike that protrudes at the end of the tail. The anal vent on the underside of the tail extends out beyond the plastron on males. Females are also typically larger than males. The head is vaguely triangular in shape, with a pointed snout and sharp beak, and yellow-green striping from the tip of the nose to the neck. Barbels are present on the chin and the throat. The plastron is relatively small, offering little protection for the legs, and has only one transverse, anterior hinge. Algae often grow on their carapaces. Their tiny tongues are covered in bud-like papillae that allow them to respire underwater.

This species is less buoyant than free swimming species and regulates buoyancy by varying its lung volume. They lack the cloacal bursae, internal pouch like structures, that some similar species have that assist with regulating buoyancy by storing water.

Geographic distribution
The eastern musk turtle ranges in southern Ontario, southern Quebec, and in the Eastern United States from southern Maine in the north, south through to Florida, and west to central Texas, with a disjunct population located in central Wisconsin.

Ecology and natural history

Behavior

The eastern musk turtle is mostly aquatic, spending the vast majority of its time in shallow, heavily vegetated waters of slow moving creeks, or in ponds. It typically only ventures onto land when the female lays eggs, to bask, or in some cases forage. It is a poor swimmer and can most often be found walking along the bottom of its native habitats, which include swamps, marshes, ephemeral pools, and large rivers and lakes. The eastern musk turtle oftentimes uses chemical cues for intraspecies communication.

Its defense mechanism is to excrete a musk scent from a small gland in its underside, hence the name musk turtle. This is used to scare away predators and natural enemies. If harassed, a wild stinkpot often will not hesitate to bite. Because its neck can extend as far as its hind feet, caution is required when handling one.

Habitat
S. odoratus turtle is found in a variety of wetland habitats and littoral zones, particularly shallow watercourses with a slow current and muddy bottom. Although it is more aquatic than some turtles, it is also capable of climbing, and may be seen basking on fallen trees and woody debris. Fallen trees and coarse woody debris are known to be important components of wetland habitat, and may be particularly beneficial to basking turtles. Like all turtles, the stinkpot must nest on land, and shoreline real estate development is detrimental. S. odoratus is also commonly found on roads during the nesting season, having fallen victim to road mortality, particularly after heavy rainfall. It hibernates buried in the mud under logs, or in muskrat lodges.

Diet

Sternotherus odoratus are omnivorous. The most common prey in the diet are mollusks (gastropods and bivalves), insects (including larva, adults, aquatic and terrestrial), and crustaceans (amphipods, isopods, and crayfish). Other items documented in the diet include earthworms, leeches, spiders, millipedes, small fish and fish eggs, amphibians (tadpoles and small frogs), small turtles, carrion, filamentous green algae, parts of vascular plants (e.g. Cornus, Eichhornia, Elodea, Hydrilla, Najas, Nuphar, Utricularia, Vallisneria), and a variety of seeds. Juveniles and sub-adults (under 5 cm.) feed on a higher percentage of aquatic insects, algae, and carrion with an ontogenetic shift to a broader diet in adults.

Sternotherus odoratus are predominantly aquatic, bottom feeders, but they are known to feed at the surface, and forage on land on occasion. Eastern musk turtles typically walk on the bottom of waterways with their necks extended searching for food, probing their heads into sand, mud, and decaying vegetation. An Oklahoma study found them to be euryphagous with seasonal changes in the diet, and food preferences directly related to availability, taking more animal food in the summer and plant material in the winter. Vegetation is a smaller, but consistent portion of the diet. Stomach and colon contents from 68 specimens were analyzed revealing 97.4% of the individuals had aquatic vegetation, comprising 20.4% of the volume.  Missouri populations of S. odoratus were studied and found monthly, seasonal, and sexual differences in dietary preferences, in part due to sexual differences in peak activity and reproductive conditions. The study refuted the idea that S. odoratus are simply dietary generalists and that fluctuations in food availability, density, seasonal variation, and reproductive conditions influence their diet. Another study in Florida found the absence, or presents and competition, between other musk turtle species can influence the diet.

A Michigan study suggested that the scavenging habits may be overestimated in the species and that musk turtles feed readily on freshly dead material but refuse animal flesh in advanced stages of decay. All fish remains from the digestive tracts were carrion, predominantly fish injured by anglers and dead or dying bait "minnows" dumped by fishermen.

Reproduction
Breeding of the eastern musk turtle occurs in the spring, and females often lay between 2 and 9 elliptical, hard-shelled eggs in a shallow burrow or under shoreline debris. An unusual behavior is the tendency to share nesting sites; in one case there were 16 nests under a single log. The eggs hatch in late summer or early fall after an incubation period of 100 to 150 days, making this turtle a species that displays delayed emergence. Although in many turtles egg size increases with female size, that may not be the cause for musk turtles. Egg width increases, and elongation (length/width) decreases as female size and clutch size increases. One study found females that differed considerably in size still produced eggs of the same mean shape and size. However, the females were of similar age suggesting egg size and shape may be age specific. In this same study they found that the female's pelvic aperture gap was always wider than the width of the largest egg and there is no found optimal egg size that prevails better than others.

 Egg predation is a major cause of mortality, as with many turtle species. In one Pennsylvania population, hatching success was only 15 percent, and predators alone destroyed 25 of 32 nests. Hatchlings are usually less than one inch long and have a very ridged shell which will become less pronounced as they age and will eventually be completely smooth and domed. Its lifespan, as with most turtles, is quite long, with specimens in captivity being recorded at 50+ years of age.

Conservation status
Though the eastern musk turtle holds no federal conservation status in the US and is quite common throughout most of its range, it has declined notably in some areas, and appears to be more sensitive than some native species to human degradation of wetlands. It is listed as a threatened species in the state of Iowa. It is listed as a species at risk in Canada, and is protected by the federal Species at Risk Act (SARA). It is also protected under Ontario's endangered species act. In this part of its range, only wetlands with minimal human impact have robust populations. Road mortality of breeding females may be one of the problems associated with human development.

References

Bibliography

External links

Tortoise Trust: Common Musk Turtle
Eastern Musk Turtle, Ontario Nature
The Center for Reptile & Amphibian Conservation: Common Musk Turtle
Sternotherus odoratus in Connecticut
Common Musk Turtle, Reptiles and Amphibians of Iowa

Further reading
Behler JL, King FW (1979). The Audubon Society Field Guide to North American Reptiles and Amphibians. New York: Alfred A. Knopf. 743 pp., 657 color plates. . (Sternotherus odoratus, p. 445 + Plate 319).
Boulenger GA (1889). Catalogue of the Chelonians, Rhynchocephalians, and Crocodiles in the British Museum (Natural History). New Edition. London: Trustees of the British Museum (Natural History). (Taylor and Francis, printers). x + 311 PP. + Plates I-III. (Cinosternum odoratum, pp. 37–38).
Goin CJ, Goin OB, Zug GR (1978). Introduction to Herpetology, Third Edition. San Francisco: W.H. Freeman. xi + 378 pp. . (Sternotherus odoratus, pp. 142, 263).
Gray JE (1825). "A Synopsis of the Genera of Reptiles and Amphibia, with a Description of some new Species". Annals of Philosophy 10: 193-217.(Sternotherus odorata, new combination, p. 211).
Latreille PA (1802). In: Sonnini CS, Latreille PA (1802). Histoire Naturelle des Reptiles, avec figures dessinées d'après nature. Tome Premier [Volume I]. Première partie. Quadrupèdes et bipèdes ovipares. Paris: Deterville. xxii + 280 pp. (Testudo ornata, new species, pp. 122-124).
Netting MG, Richmond ND (editors) (1970). Pennsylvania Reptiles and Amphibians. Third Edition, Fifth Printing. Harrisburg Pennsylvania: Pennsylvania Fish Commission. 24 pp. (Sternotherus odoratus, p. 11).
Powell R, Conant R, Collins JT (2016). Peterson Field Guide to Reptiles and Amphibians of Eastern and Central North America, Fourth Edition. Boston and New York: Houghton Mifflin Harcourt. xiv + 494 pp., 47 plates, 207 figures. . (Sternotherus odoratus, p. 229 + Plates 19, 21).
Smith HM, Brodie ED Jr (1982). Reptiles of North America: A Guide to Field Identification. New York: Golden Press. 240 pp.  (paperback),  (hardcover). (Sternotherus odoratus, pp. 28–29).

odoratus
Reptiles of the United States
Reptiles of Canada
Fauna of the Great Lakes region (North America)
Fauna of the Plains-Midwest (United States)
Fauna of the Eastern United States
Reptiles of Ontario
Reptiles described in 1801
Taxa named by Pierre André Latreille